Geno Radev (born 15 April 1946) is a Bulgarian gymnast. He competed in eight events at the 1972 Summer Olympics.

References

1946 births
Living people
Bulgarian male artistic gymnasts
Olympic gymnasts of Bulgaria
Gymnasts at the 1972 Summer Olympics
People from Balchik